Poltroon was an event horse ridden by American rider Torrance Watkins.

References 

Eventing horses
Individual mares
Horses in the Olympics